Army Command may refer to:

 Army Command (Denmark)
 Army Command (Germany)

See also
Command (military formation)
:Category:Army commands (military formations)